Richard Norton-Taylor (born 6 June 1944) is a British editor, journalist, and playwright. He wrote for The Guardian on defence and security matters from 1975 to 2016, and was the newspaper's security editor. He now works for the investigative journalism site Declassified UK.

Early life and education
He was born Richard Seymour Norton-Taylor to Lt. Seymour Norton-Taylor, R.A. and Gweneth Joan Powell (died 9 January 1978).

Norton-Taylor was educated at The King's School in Canterbury, Kent, going on to study at Hertford College, a constituent college of the University of Oxford, and the College of Europe in Bruges.

Career
He was the European Community and Brussels, Belgium, correspondent for both The Washington Post and Newsweek between 1967 and 1975, while also contributing to The Economist and the Financial Times.

Norton-Taylor joined The Guardian in 1975, concentrating on Whitehall, official secrecy, and behind-the-scenes decision-making. He became an expert on British and Soviet intelligence activities during the Second World War. In 1988, he made an extended appearance on the TV discussion programme After Dark, alongside (among others) Harold Musgrove, Hilary Wainwright and George Brumwell, discussing his book Blacklist: The Inside Story of Political Vetting, co-written with Mark Hollingsworth.

He has written several plays based on transcripts of public inquiries, including The Colour of Justice (1999), based on the hearing of the MacPherson Inquiry into the police conduct of the investigation into the murder of Stephen Lawrence. Another was Justifying War: Scenes from the Hutton Inquiry (2003), both of which premiered at the Tricycle Theatre.

Norton-Taylor left The Guardian in July 2016 and currently writes for Declassified UK.

Awards
In 1986 Norton-Taylor won the Freedom of Information Campaign award. That same year he was prevented initially by a court injunction from reporting the contents of Spycatcher (1987), the memoirs of Peter Wright, a former MI5 agent. The government's injunction was dismissed in the High Court by Lord Justice Scott.

Norton-Taylor was one of the few journalists to cover the Scott inquiry from start to finish. His play, Half the Picture, based on the inquiry, received a 1994 Time Out Drama, Comedy and Dance award for its "brave initiative".

In 2010, with fellow Guardian journalist Ian Cobain, he was awarded a Human Rights Campaign of the Year Award from Liberty for their "investigation into Britain's complicity in the use of torture" by the United States against detainees at their facility at Guantanamo Bay and at black sites.

Personal life
In 1967, he married Anna C. Rendle, eldest daughter of Mr. and Mrs. J. E. Rendle, of Kemerton, near Tewkesbury, Gloucestershire.

Norton-Taylor is a Member of Council of the Royal United Services Institute and a trustee of the Civil Liberties Trust and the London Action Trust.

See also

British playwrights since 1950
List of English writers
List of playwrights by nationality and year of birth
List of people from Kent
List of University of Oxford people

References

External links
 Richard Norton-Taylor on Twitter
  Richard Norton-Taylor's articles, Guardian Unlimited website
 
  Richard Norton-Taylor at doollee.com, the playwright's database

1944 births
Alumni of Hertford College, Oxford
English dramatists and playwrights
English newspaper editors
English male journalists
English political writers
English reporters and correspondents
Financial Times people
Living people
Newsweek people
People from Canterbury
Place of birth missing (living people)
The Economist people
The Guardian journalists
The Washington Post journalists
Writers from London
People educated at The King's School, Canterbury
English male dramatists and playwrights
British social commentators
British investigative journalists